Saint Salvius may refer to

 Salvius of Albi (died 584), bishop of Albi in Francia
 Salvius of Amiens (died c. 615), 7th-century bishop of Amiens